Armande de Polignac, comtesse de Chabannes-La Palice (Marie Armande Mathilde; 8 January 1876 – 29 April 1962) was a French composer, the niece of Prince Edmond de Polignac and Princess Winnaretta de Polignac, the patron of Ravel, Stravinsky and Milhaud. She studied privately with Eugène Gigout and Gabriel Fauré, as well as with Vincent d'Indy at the Schola Cantorum.

De Polignac married the Comte de Chabanne la Palice.

Works
Selected works include:
La flûte de jade song cycle
Chant d'amour (in La flûte de jade) (Text: Franz Toussaint after Chen-Teuo-Tsan)
Ki-Fong (in La flûte de jade) (Text: Franz Toussaint after Tschang-So-Su)
Ki-Fong (in La flûte de jade) (Text: after Franz Toussaint) ENG FRE
La rose rouge (in La flûte de jade) (Text: Franz Toussaint after Li-Tai-Po)
Le heron blanc (in La flûte de jade) (Text: Franz Toussaint after Li-Tai-Po)
Le palais ruiné (in La flûte de jade) (Text: Franz Toussaint after Tu Fu)
Li-Si (in La flûte de jade) (Text: Franz Toussaint after Li-Tai-Po)
Li-Si (in La flûte de jade) (Text: after Franz Toussaint)
Ngo Gay Ngy (in La flûte de jade) (Text: Franz Toussaint after Wou-Hao)
Ngo Gay Ngy (in La flûte de jade) (Text: after Franz Toussaint)
Sonate pour violon et piano
La Source Lointaine, ballet
Valse

References

1876 births
1962 deaths
20th-century classical composers
French classical composers
French women classical composers
Armande
Pupils of Vincent d'Indy
20th-century French women musicians
20th-century French composers
20th-century women composers